= Minamitaka Bridge =

Bridge in Tokyo, Japan

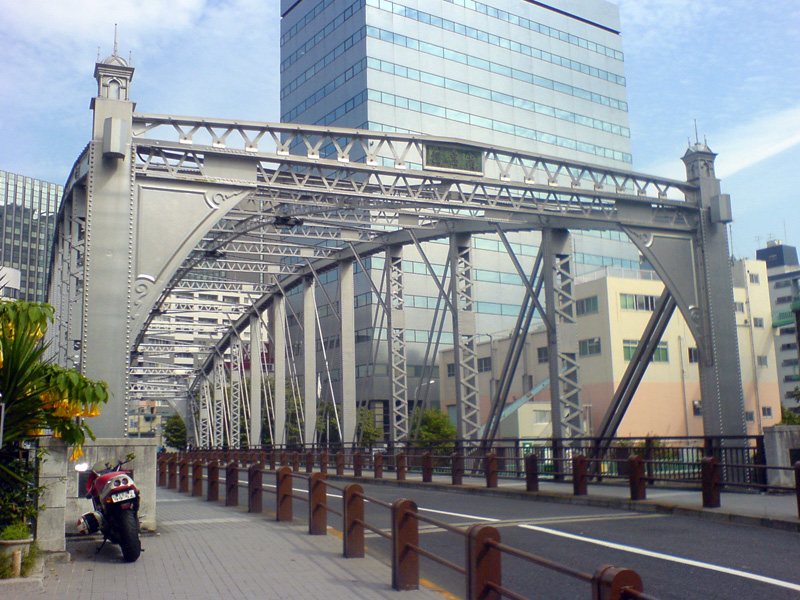
- The bridge in 2006
- Coordinates: 35.6730°N 139.7815°E

Minamitaka Bridge is a bridge in Chūō, Tokyo, Japan.
